Rangrez  is an Indian caste and are mostly part of the dyeing community. Rangrez are mainly from the Hindu community and mainly found in Marwar, Bihar and Uttar Pradesh, though there is also a significant population of Rangrez who are Muslims, who are Muslim Rangrez with Arab and Persian ethnicity.

See also

 Savji
Bhavsar

References

External links 

 
 

Ethnic groups in India
Hindu communities
Social groups of Bihar
Social groups of Uttar Pradesh
Social groups of West Bengal
Muslim communities of India